Megatropolis is Iron Savior's sixth full-length album, released on June 4, 2007. It was recorded, mixed and engineered at Powerhouse Studios in Hamburg in February 2007 with the drums being recorded at HammerMusic in January 2007. The album was re-released in 2015 as Megatropolis 2.0 with partly re-recorded vocal tracks, new mixed sound and a different track listing, as the band was dissatisfied with the original product. It is the last album to feature Yenz Leonhardt on bass, who would then join Stormwarrior shortly that year.

This album is dedicated to Piet Sielck's late brother Tim, who died in November 2005.

Background
In a descriptive detail regarding the 2015 re-release of Megatropolis, Piet Sielck explains:

"AFM has informed me that our "Megatropolis" album is sold out, so the idea came up to rework the material and release a new edition. Being unhappy with the album for a long time, I am absolutely delighted to get a chance to correct my errors. The new mix will carry all Iron Savior trademarks such as big choir backings and lots of multi timbral vocals. I left all these goodies out at the time to make the album more distinguishable from my former second band Savage Circus... a fatal error, which I finally can correct now."

Track listing

Megatropolis 2.0 Track listing

Notes 
 "Iron Watcher" is a medley of the songs "Iron Savior" and "Watcher in the Sky" from the band's 1997 debut album Iron Savior.
 "The Omega Man" and "Cybernetic Queen" were mistakenly misspelled as "The Omega Men" and "Cybernatic Queen" on the original back cover track listing but was fixed on the 2015 re-release with the latter still maintaining its name

Album line-up
 Piet Sielck – lead vocals, guitar
 Joachim "Piesel" Küstner – guitar, backing vocals
 Yenz Leonhardt – bass, backing vocals
 Thomas Nack – drums and miscellaneous percussion

References

Iron Savior albums
2007 albums